Paying the Piper is a 1921 American silent society drama film directed by George Fitzmaurice and written by Ouida Bergère. The film stars Dorothy Dickson, Alma Tell, George Fawcett, Rod La Rocque, Robert Schable, Katherine Emmet, and Reginald Denny. The film was released on January 16, 1921, by Paramount Pictures. It is not known whether the film currently survives, and it may be a lost film.

Cast 
Dorothy Dickson as Barbara Wyndham
Alma Tell as Marcia Marillo
George Fawcett as John Grahame
Rod La Rocque as Larry Grahame
Robert Schable as Charles R. Wyndham
Katherine Emmet as Mrs. Wyndham 
Reginald Denny as Keith Larne

Production
The working title of the film was Money Mad.

References

External links 

 
 
Posters at silentfilmstillarchive.com

1921 films
1920s English-language films
Silent American drama films
1921 drama films
Paramount Pictures films
Films directed by George Fitzmaurice
American black-and-white films
American silent feature films
Films with screenplays by Ouida Bergère
1920s American films